Unique Brothers is a 2014 Italian comedy film written and directed  by Alessio Maria Federici and starring Raoul Bova, Luca Argentero, Carolina Crescentini and Miriam Leone.

Plot

Cast 

Raoul Bova as Pietro
Luca Argentero as  Francesco
Carolina Crescentini as  Giulia
Miriam Leone as  Sofia
Sergio Assisi as  Gustavo
 Eleonora Gaggero as Stella 
 Michela Andreozzi as The Judge
 Augusto Zucchi as  The Director

See also 
 List of Italian films of 2014

References

External links 

2014 comedy films
Italian comedy films
2010s Italian films